Enrique Ricardo Lewandowski (born May 11, 1948) is a  Brazilian judge and a justice of the Supreme Federal Court of Brazil.

Lewandowski presided over the impeachment trial of president Dilma Rousseff, and controversially separated the cassation of her term from the cassation of her political rights. Two votes, then, occurred, and, upon losing her mandate, she maintained her political rights. Vice President Michel Temer succeeded her.

Lewandowski was replaced by Carmen Lúcia who was championed by José Celso de Mello Filho, Brazil's most senior jurist. Lewandowski had been known for championing a reduction in oversight of judges and an increase in their remuneration. Lucia's champion gave a speech talking about the need to remove corruption despite the presence of a number of alleged suspects.

Publications
Proteção dos Direitos Humanos na Ordem Interna e Internacional. Rio de Janeiro: Forense, 1984.
Pressupostos Materiais e Formais da Intervenção Federal no Brasil. São Paulo: Ed. Revista dos Tribunais, 1994.
Direito Comunitário e Jurisdição Supranacional: o papel do juiz no processo de integração regional (ed.). São Paulo: Ed. Juarez de Oliveira, 2000.
Globalização, Regionalização e Soberania. São Paulo: Juarez de Oliveira, 2004.
A influência de Dalmo Dallari nas decisões dos tribunais (ed.). São Paulo: Saraiva, 2011.

References

External links
Biography 

1948 births
21st-century Brazilian judges
Brazilian people of Polish descent
Living people
Supreme Federal Court of Brazil justices
The Fletcher School at Tufts University alumni
Vaza Jato